John Arnot Davidson (born 30 December 1925), better known as Jack Davidson is a Scottish former footballer who played as an inside forward for Dundee United, East Fife and Kilmarnock. Davidson helped East Fife win the 1947–48 Scottish League Cup.

References

1925 births
Possibly living people
Scottish footballers
Footballers from Fife
Association football inside forwards
Dundee United F.C. players
East Fife F.C. players
Kilmarnock F.C. players
Rhyl F.C. players
Scottish Football League players
Dundee Violet F.C. players
Scottish Junior Football Association players